Don Beck may refer to:

 Don Edward Beck (born 1937), American management consultant and author
 Don Beck (politician) (born 1936), Australian politician
 Don Beck (basketball) (born 1953), American professional basketball coach